Niklas Carl Bosson Natt och Dag (born October 3, 1979, in Stockholm) is a Swedish novelist. He debuted with the acclaimed historical detective novel The Wolf and the Watchman, the first part of the Bellman noir (Jean Mickel Cardell) trilogy, followed by The City Between the Bridges and 1795.

Early life 
Born to the Natt och Dag Swedish noble family, from 2000 until 2003 Niklas studied in Kalmar, Sweden. Between October 2006 and October 2008, he worked as the editor-in-chief of the Slitz magazine, after which he switched to freelance work.

He made his book debut in 2017 with The Wolf and the Watchman (original title: 1793), the first part of the Bellman noir (Jean Mickel Cardell) trilogy, also known as Winge und Cardell ermitteln in German-speaking countries. The book was named the "Best Swedish debut of 2017" by the Swedish Crime Writers' Academy. At the 2018 Gothenburg Book Fair the book was additionally awarded the Crimetime Specsavers Award for the best detective debut, as well as voted the Book of the Year in the Bonniers Bokklubb annual competition. The rights to the book have been sold to over 30 countries.

In April 2019 the audiobook version read by Martin Wallström was awarded the Stora Ljudbokspriset Best Novel prize at Storytel Awards. The second part of the trilogy, The City Between the Bridges (original title: 1794), was published in September 2019.

In May 2020 Natt och Dag was awarded the Stockholm City Honorary Award for literature.

In 2021 the final installment in the trilogy was published under the original name 1795.

Bibliography 
 2017 – The Wolf and the Watchman (original title: 1793)
 2019 – The City Between the Bridges (original title: 1794)
 2021 – 1795 (original title: 1795)

References

External links 

 Niklas Natt och Dag at the Bokförlaget Forum

Swedish male novelists
Swedish historical novelists
21st-century Swedish novelists
21st-century Swedish male writers
Nordic detective fiction writers
Crime novelists
Swedish crime fiction writers
Writers from Stockholm
Swedish nobility
1979 births
Living people